The Shanks Islands form a group of five small rocky islets located close to the south-western coast of Tasmania, Australia. They comprise part of the Southwest National Park and the Tasmanian Wilderness World Heritage Site.

Fauna
The islets are part of the Port Davey Islands Important Bird Area, so identified by BirdLife International because of its importance for breeding seabirds. Recorded breeding seabird and wader species are the little penguin, short-tailed shearwater (8,700 pairs), fairy prion (5,000 pairs), silver gull, sooty oystercatcher and Caspian tern.

See also

 List of islands of Tasmania

References

Islands of Tasmania
South West Tasmania
Protected areas of Tasmania
Important Bird Areas of Tasmania